Yaak is an unincorporated community and census-designated place in Lincoln County, Montana, United States. It is located along the Yaak River, within the Kootenai National Forest. As of the 2020 census, its population was 338.

Yaak has frequently been noted on lists of unusual place names.

Yaak derives its name from the Yaak River. According to local lore, A’ak is a Kootenai name meaning “Arrow.” The Kootenai River forms the shape of a drawn bow; its tributary the Yaak River is its arrow. Homesteaders arrived shortly after the passage of the Forest Homestead Act of 1906.

Demographics

Climate
This climatic region is typified by large seasonal temperature differences, with warm to hot (and often humid) summers and cold (sometimes severely cold) winters.  According to the Köppen Climate Classification system, Yaak has a humid continental climate, abbreviated "Dfb" on climate maps.

References

External links
 The Yaak Business Directory
 "Montana: The Lights Go On in the Yaak River Valley"

Census-designated places in Lincoln County, Montana
Census-designated places in Montana
Unincorporated communities in Montana
Unincorporated communities in Lincoln County, Montana